The 1927 season was the Chicago Bears' 8th in the National Football League. The team was unable to improve on their 12–1–3 record from 1926 and finished with a 9–3–2 record under head coach George Halas earning them a third-place finish in the team standings behind the New York Giants and the Green Bay Packers. Notable games during this season were a split of the season series with the New York Yankees, led by former and future Bear Red Grange, a split of the season's games against crosstown rivals Chicago Cardinals, two wins over the Green Bay Packers, and, oddest of all, a win and a tie over the Frankford Yellowjackets. What makes the games with Frankford so notable is they were played back to back on December 3 and 4, with the first game in Frankford and the second in Chicago. The Bears also played the eventual champion New York Giants, losing 13–7.
Paddy Driscoll, William Senn, and Joey Sternaman again starred for the Bears. Driscoll ran for 5 touchdowns and threw 4 others; Senn had 3 rushing TDs and 2 receiving scores; and Sternaman ran for and caught 1 touchdown each, while passing for another. Owner and coach George Halas continued to play well, scoring 3 touchdowns himself, 2 on defense.

Future Hall of Fame players
 Paddy Driscoll, back
 George Halas, end
 Ed Healey, tackle
 Link Lyman, tackle
 George Trafton, center

Other leading players
 William Senn, back
 Ed Sternaman, back
 Joe Sternaman, quarterback
 Laurie Walquist, quarterback

Schedule

Standings

Chicago Bears
Chicago Bears seasons
Chicago Bears